White as Milk, Red as Blood (also known as As White as Milk, as Red as Blood) is a 2013 film directed by Giacomo Campiotti, a film adaptation of the novel of the same name by Alessandro D'Avenia. However, the film has significant discrepancies with respect to the novel.

Plot    
Leo is a young third year high school student, who is in love with Béatrice, a French girl. She is one year older than him, and he sees her only at school or at the bus stop. Leo also has a classmate, Silvia, who is in love with him. He has known her since childhood and he often visits her and confides in her, because he considers her his best friend.

After the Easter holidays, Leo discovers that Béatrice has been hospitalized due to developing leukemia. This leads Leo to do anything he can to get to know her and save her. He decides to become a bone marrow donor, believing that he can save Béatrice. Unfortunately, he discovers that their bone marrow is not compatible, and is devastated. Meanwhile, at school, Leo establishes a friendship with a young english substitute teacher, nicknamed the dreamer. The teacher encourages his pupils to believe in their dreams, and Leo, tormented by all this, asks for help from the substitute. Silvia regretted having given Leo the wrong number for Béatrice, and encourages him to declare his love for her. Beatrice, however, knows that Silvia and Leo were made for each other and tells Leo that what they have is true love.

The girl is very ill, but lies telling Leo that she found a bone marrow donor compatible with her, that she would go to France with her family for two months and finally ask him not to call her. Leo is called from the hospital because his marrow is compatible with a sick person. After a long discussion with her parents and with Silvia's help, she manages to convince them and goes to the hospital, where by donating the marrow to a young mother, she saves her life, discovering the greatness of her gesture with Silvia by her side. But in a short time he discovers that Béatrice did not go so well: the transplant was not enough, Beatrice pretended to Leo that she was recovering, so as not to hurt him, and when Béatrice dies, towards the end of the school year Leo si he finds himself with no more dreams to live for, but on the other hand finds Silvia's love.

Cast 

 Filippo Scicchitano portrays Leo, a sixteen years old teenager, who does not want to study and hates professors. He is madly in love with Beatrice; her love is his dream. Hoping to be able to save her, he donates the bone marrow to the hospital where she is hospitalized, and tries to recover her grades at school. Only later he will fall in love with Silvia.
 Aurora Ruffino is Silvia, a classmate in love with Leo who, however, sees her only as a best friend. Silvia is studious and solar. She gives Leo a fake phone number, pretending to be Beatrice's, which causes him to get angry. He eventually will fall for her nonetheless.
 Luca Argentero is Il Sognatore (The Dreamer), a young supply teacher who believes in dreams and wants his students not to be superficial and resigned as adults. He loves his profession and practices boxing in an abandoned gym where he will lead Leo to train with him so that the boy can express all his sadness. It will be Leo's point of reference.
 Gaia Weiss is Béatrice Morel, a seventeen-year-old French girl, quite wise for her age. She has red hair and suffers from leukemia.

Production 
Filming began in Turin on May 26, 2012 for a duration of six weeks.

Soundtrack 
The original music of the film was composed by Andrea Guerra. The main song of the repertoire of the soundtrack is Se si potesse non morire (If you could not die) of Modà, ranked third at the Sanremo Festival 2013. There are also : Come un pittore (Like a painter) and Tappeto di fragole (Strawberries carpet) also by Modà and Tutta scena (All an act) by J-Ax.

Distribution 
The film was released in Italian cinemas on April 4, 2013 by 01 Distribution. The first programming weekend received €1,163,036.

References

External links

2013 films
Italian romantic drama films
2013 romantic drama films
Films based on Italian novels
Films directed by Giacomo Campiotti
Films set in Turin
2010s Italian-language films